Felice Maniero (born September 2, 1954) is a former Italian crime boss who was the head of the Mala del Brenta, a criminal organisation based in the region of Veneto throughout the 1980s and 1990s. His nickname is Faccia d'Angelo ("Angel Face"), which he shares with the Milanese mobster Francis Turatello and Camorra boss Edoardo Contini. He was born at Campolongo Maggiore, in the province of Venice. Originally the leader of a small band of thieves, through connections with Sicilian mafiosi in exile in Veneto he was able to expand and enlarge his organization and modeled it after the mafia. He was a prolific drug trafficker and was particularly notorious for taking part in many armed robberies, some with extremely high loots.

In February, 1995, Maniero became a pentito (collaborator with Italian Justice), and subsequently helped in dismantling his organization. However, Maniero allegedly continued a number of criminal activities while many of his former henchmen re-organised the Mala del Brenta in order to ensure its survival.

On 23 August 2010, Maniero was set free.

Notes

References 
Dianese, Maurizio (1995). Il bandito Felice Maniero, il Cardo editore, Venice.
Guerretta, Danilo; Zornetta, Monica (2006). A casa nostra. Cinquant'anni di mafia e criminalità in Veneto, Dalai Editore, Milan.
Zornetta, Monica (2013). La resa. Ascesa, declino e «pentimento» di Felice Maniero, Baldini & Castoldi, Milan.

External links
 A fan site dedicated to the criminal personality of Felice Maniero
 Profile of Felice Maniero

1954 births
Living people
People from the Metropolitan City of Venice
Veneti malavitosi
Pentiti